Raphael Andrade da Silva (born September 7, 1982 in Rio de Janeiro), known as Raphael Andrade, is a Brazilian footballer who plays for GAMA as defender.

Career statistics

References

External links

1982 births
Living people
Association football defenders
Campeonato Brasileiro Série B players
Campeonato Brasileiro Série C players
Campeonato Brasileiro Série D players
Brasiliense Futebol Clube players
Clube Atlético Bragantino players
Footballers from Rio de Janeiro (city)
Brazilian footballers